Kvadrat is a 2013 documentary feature film written, co-produced, and directed by Anatoly Ivanov. The film explores the realities of techno DJing, using the example of Russian DJ Andrey Pushkarev. Filmed as a hybrid between a road-movie and a music video, Kvadrat not only illustrates the festive atmosphere of techno night clubs, but also reveals the lesser known side of this profession. Shot in Switzerland, France, Hungary, Romania and Russia, the film omits the typical documentary elements: no interviews, no explanatory voice-over, no facts, no figures. It gives priority to abundantly sounding techno music, leaving the detailed interpretation to the viewer.

Synopsis

DJ Andrey Pushkarev wakes up in his Moscow apartment, packs his vinyl records into a rolling bag and leaves for Domodedovo airport, to fly to Zurich. Upon arriving, he is greeted by the promoter of the Supermarket club. After falling asleep in the hotel, he is rudely awaken by the alarm, dresses up and leaves for the job in the middle of the night. After finishing his DJ set, he leaves the club to take the train to Geneva. While en route, instead of admiring the Alpine scenery, he sleeps.

After a short visit to a friend in Geneva (whether male or female is not shown), he takes the plane back to Moscow. He thus completes the first "story loop", repeated with slight variations throughout the entire film, a metaphor on techno music loops.

In his flat in Moscow, after quickly replying to booking requests on Skype, he goes through his huge collection of vinyl techno records to prepare his next performances. A quick shave and he leaves to take a taxi for the railway station, where he boards a train for Saint Petersburg.

Once in Saint Petersburg, he waits at a friend’s flat, while listening to tracks on Beatport. After nightfall, he is driven to Barakobamabar, where he plays a set. At dawn, his friends accompany him to the metro, one of them barely walking from too much drink. Pushkarev then takes the metro back to the train station, using a short-cut through Saint Petersburg down-town.

Back in Moscow, and back to the beginning of the story loop, he visits his friends and while drinking tea, debates his dream of playing techno during the day and bringing the techno club industry more in line with a healthy lifestyle.

After a short metro trip, he plays in a Moscow club Mir, after which he flies out to Geneva, again. There, he takes the same train as previously, looping in the other direction, to Olten via Bern. Greeted by the club promoter, he goes directly to the local club Terminus, where technical problems hamper his performance. The Technics SL-1210 turntable refuses to switch the playback speed from 45 rpm to 33 rpm. Later, a club technician bumps his elbow into the tonearm. Tired, Pushkarev takes a cab to the hotel, where he checks his in-coming booking requests on the notebook computer.

In the morning, he takes the train to Lausanne where he changes for a TGV to Paris. After a performance at the 4 Éléments bar, he continues his trip to the SWISS hub in Zurich, where he boards a flight to Budapest.

The local crew transport him from Budapest to Kecel, where he plays at the club Korona to a massive audience. Asleep in the car back to Budapest, he misses the decorated down-town and gets only a couple of hours to repack at the hotel, before leaving again for the airport, restarting the loop.

He flies back to the Zurich hub, where he changes for a flight to Bucharest.

Picked-up at the airport, he is driven to Craiova, where he plays at club Krypton without any rest.

The next day, he sleeps in the car during a huge snowstorm of 2012, one of the deadliest in Romania’s history, to arrive in Cluj-Napoca’s club Midi. He plays to an ecstatic crowd, only to wake up in the same battered BMW driving again through winter.

Finally, he arrives at the seaside, stares at the waves and the sunset and silently walks away, leaving his bag of vinyls on the beach.

Production

Because of budget restrictions, Anatoly Ivanov acted as writer, co-producer, director, cinematographer, editor, and sound engineer.

Development

Anatoly Ivanov formed an idea for Kvadrat after completing an impromptu 30-minute short in Cantonese in February 2011 about a private Hong Kong martial arts event. He suggested to shoot a realistic DJing documentary to Andrey Pushkarev, when the two met in the director’s Paris flat shortly afterwards.

Anatoly Ivanov teamed up with Yury Rysev to privately finance the project, initially mis-calculating the total required by a factor of 5. A drastic cost-cutting approach to production allowed to film the feature in 5 countries, despite the tiny budget, thanks in part for everyone on the project volunteering without any financial compensation.

Locations 

Kvadrat was filmed exclusively on location in:

 Switzerland
 Zurich
 Geneva
 Olten
 France
 Paris
 Marseille
 Hungary
 Budapest
 Kecel
 Romania
 Bucharest
 Craiova
 Cluj-Napoca
 Russia
 Moscow
 Saint Petersburg
 Izhevsk, Udmurtia
 Votkinsk, Udmurtia
 Stepanovo, Udmurtia

And during regular flights by SWISS and Izhavia, train journeys by SBB CFF FFS, RZD, and on public transport in Geneva’s TPG, Saint Petersburg Metro and Moscow Metro.

Cinematography

Principal photography began on August 27, 2011, ended on July 16, 2012 and lasted 55 days (if counting the days when the camera was rolling).

The film was shot in the spherical 1080p HD format using a pair of Canon 1D mark IV cameras and just two Canon still-photography lenses.

Anatoly Ivanov was the only crew to shoot video and record sound for the film, carrying all the cinema equipment on himself. He eschewed the use of dollies, cranes, jibs, steadicams, tripods, sliders and car mounts and shot Kvadrat exclusively with a handheld rig. No additional lighting was used either.

Editing and post-production

Editing in Final Cut Pro X, post-production started immediately after the wrap of principal photography. It took 1 year in Geneva and was plagued by technical problems, such as removal of hot pixels on the footage from the cameras and inadequate computer hardware (a 2011 MacBook Pro and a pair of Sony MDR7506 headphones).

Music

The film features 35 tracks played by DJ Pushkarev, representing various subgenres of techno music, ranging from deep house to dub techno through minimal techno and electro:

 "Abyss" by Manoo – Deeply Rooted House, 2008
 "Direct" by Kris Wadsworth – NRK Sound Division, 2009
 "La Grippe (Helly Larson Remix)" by George Soliis – Wasabi, 2011
 "Air" by Havantepe – Styrax Leaves, 2007
 "Mauna Loa" by Mick Rubin – Musik Gewinnt Freunde, 2009
 "Soul Sounds (Freestyle Man Original Dope Remix)" by Sasse – Moodmusic, 2005
 "Tammer (David Duriez Remix From Da Vault)" by Phonogenic – 20:20 Vision, 2000
 "Track B1" by Slowhouse Two – Slowhouse Recordings, 2008
 "Post" by Claro Intelecto – Modern Love, 2011
 "Acid Face" by Scott Findley – Iron Box Music, 2003
 "Warriors" by Two Armadillos – Secretsundaze Music, 2007
 "Grand Theft Vinyl (JV Mix)" by Green Thumb vs JV – So Sound Recordings, 2004
 "Tobacco (Alveol Mix)" by Kiano Below Bangkok – Only Good Shit Records, 2011
 "When The Dark Calls" by Pop Out and Play – Alola, 2001
 "Circular Motion (Vivid)" by Christian Linder – Phono Elements, 2002
 "Blacktro (Demo 1)" by Jerome Sydenham and Joe Claussell – UK Promotions, 2007
 "Green Man" by Mr. Bizz – Deepindub.org, 2008
 "Tahiti" by Ben Rourke – Stuga Musik, 2011
 "Willpower" by Joshua Collins – Prolekult, 2002
 "Lullaby For Rastko (Herb LF Remix)" by Petkovski – Farside, 2011
 "Agape Dub" by Luke Hess – Modelisme Records, 2009
 "Glacial Valley" by Makam – Pariter, 2011
 "The Time" by Vizar – Jato Unit Analog, 2011
 "Libido" by Sean Palm and Charlie Mo – Railyard Recordings, 2008
 "Ahck (Jichael Mackson Remix)" by Minilogue – Wir, 2007
 "Altered State (Artificial Remix)" by Jason Vasilas – Tangent Beats, 2004
 "Modern Times (Dub Mix)" by Hatikvah – Baalsaal, 2009
 "That Day (Loudeast Black Label Remix)" by DJ Grobas – Thrasher Home Recordings, 2004
 "The Hills (John Selway Dub)" by Filippo Mancinelli and Allen May – Darkroom Dubs, 2011
 "Running Man" by Petar Dundov – Music Man Records, 2007
 "Ice" by Monolake – Imbalance Computer Music, 2000
 "Lucky Punch" by Peter Dildo – Trackdown Records, 2006
 "Live Jam 1" by Rhauder – Polymorph, 2011
 "Can U Hear Shapes?" by Pop Out and Play – Alola, 2001
 "Be No-One" by Charles Webster – Statra Recordings, 2001

Themes

Besides the obvious facade of DJ work seen in a night club, Kvadrat explores the lesser-known themes of DJ travel, fatigue, sleep deprivation, self-destruction, absurdity, loneliness, purpose of art and stereotypes of the artist.

Genre

Anatoly Ivanov combined the genres of a road movie and a music video, creating a modern-day techno musical without much dialogue. He deliberately applied the aesthetics of fiction films to non-fiction footage and removed documentary clichés in order to achieve a third category, a result between fiction and documentary genres. In other words, a documentary using fiction techniques such as exhibition, metaphors and symbolism to express ideas, provoke emotions and ask questions implicitly, instead of exposition, staged interviews and explanatory voice-over to communicate the answers explicitly.

Release

The film was quietly released in 720p quality on Vimeo on October 17, 2013, with English, French and Russian subtitles, accumulating 53 000 plays (as of September 2014, not to be confused with loads). It premiered in cinema as 2K DCP during the Kommt Zusammen festival in Rostock, Germany, on April 18, 2014.

Reception

The public and press were surprised by a stealthy release without any marketing campaign.

The reviewers praised the aesthetic, atmospheric, musical and meditative qualities of the film, its realistic nature. As well as the decision to forego traditional interviews and adopt innovative editing.

See also 

 Speaking in Code — an American documentary film about techno artists Modeselektor, Wighnomy Brothers, Philip Sherburne, Monolake and David Day
 Berlin Calling — a German fiction film about DJ and composer Ickarus (Paul Kalkbrenner) struggling with drug abuse
 Techno
 Dub techno

References

External links
 
 
 

2013 documentary films
2013 films
Documentary films about electronic music and musicians
Films set in France
Films set in Hungary
Films set in Moscow
Films set in Paris
Films set in Romania
Films set in Russia
Films set in Saint Petersburg
Films set in Switzerland
Films shot in France
Films shot in Hungary
Films shot in Moscow
Films shot in Paris
Films shot in Romania
Films shot in Russia
Films shot in Switzerland
French documentary films
French independent films
Russian independent films
Musical films based on actual events
French road movies
2010s road movies
Russian documentary films
2010s Russian-language films
Techno
DJing
2013 directorial debut films
2010s English-language films
2013 multilingual films
French multilingual films
Russian multilingual films
2010s French films